Committed is an a cappella group of six male vocalists from Huntsville, Alabama, all students at Oakwood University, a historically black Seventh-day Adventist school in Huntsville. The group—Therry Thomas, Dennis Baptiste, Tommy Gervais, Geston Pierre, Robert Pressley and Maurice Staple—began singing together in 2003, inspired by another a cappella group that originated at Oakwood, Take 6.

The group won the second season of the musical competition The Sing-Off. They won the title on the finale broadcast on December 20, 2010 broadcast on NBC, singing a vocal a cappella arrangement of "We Are the Champions" from Queen.  

The singing group released their self-titled album Committed on Epic Records.

Performances on The Sing Off
Episode 1: "This Love"
Episode 2: "Apologize"
Episode 3: "Every Breath You Take"
Episode 3: "I Want It That Way"
Episode 4: "Let's Stay Together"
Episode 4: "Usher medley"
Finale: "Motownphilly"
Finale: "Hold My Hand"
Finale: "We Are The Champions"

Discography

Committed
Home for Christmas

References

External links
 

American vocal groups
A cappella musical groups